Brandizzo is a comune (municipality) in the Metropolitan City of Turin in the Italian region Piedmont, located about  northeast of Turin.

Brandizzo borders the following municipalities: Chivasso, Volpiano, Settimo Torinese, and San Raffaele Cimena.

References

External links
 Official website